Martin Bučko (born 13 May 2000) is a Slovak professional ice hockey defenceman who is currently playing for the HC Dynamo Pardubice of the Czech Extraliga (ELH).

International play
He was selected to make his full IIHF international debut, participating for Slovakia in the 2021 IIHF World Championship.

Career statistics

Regular season and playoffs

International

References

External links
 

2000 births
Living people
Slovak ice hockey defencemen
HC Košice players
MsHK Žilina players
HC Vrchlabí players
HC Dynamo Pardubice players
Sportspeople from Martin, Slovakia
Slovak expatriate ice hockey players in the Czech Republic